William R. Rehm is an American who has served as a member of the New Mexico House of Representatives, representing District 31, since January 2007.

Elections
2012 Rehm was challenged in the June 5, 2012 Republican Primary, but won with 1,898 votes (63.6%) and won the November 6, 2012 General election with 10,426 votes (60.1%) against Democratic nominee Joanne Allen.
2004 When District 31 Republican Representative Joseph Thompson left the Legislature, Rehm ran in the June 1, 2004 Republican Primary but lost to Greg Payne; Payne won the November 2, 2004 General election against Democratic nominee Michael Corwin.
2006 When Representative Payne left the Legislature, Rehm was unopposed for the June 6, 2006 Republican Primary, winning with 1,193 votes and won the November 7, 2006 General election with 7,443 votes (58.8%) against Democratic nominee Barbara Scharf.
2008 Rehm was unopposed for both the June 8, 2008 Republican Primary, winning with 3,241 votes and the November 4, 2008 General election, winning with 11,117 votes.
2010 Rehm was unopposed for the June 1, 2010 Republican Primary, winning with 3,037 votes and the November 2, 2010 General election, winning with 8,184 votes (63.2%) against Democratic nominee Michael Malloy.

References

External links
Official page at the New Mexico Legislature
Campaign site

William Rehm at Ballotpedia
William R. Rehm at the National Institute on Money in State Politics

Place of birth missing (living people)
Year of birth missing (living people)
Living people
American police officers
Republican Party members of the New Mexico House of Representatives
Politicians from Albuquerque, New Mexico
21st-century American politicians